Chondrorrhina is a genus of fruit and flower chafers belonging to the family Scarabaeidae, subfamily Cetoniinae.

Species
 Chondrorrhina abbreviata (Fabricius, 1792) 
 Chondrorrhina collinsi Allard, 1992 - Ethiopia
 Chondrorrhina distincta (Neervoort van de Poll, 1886) 
 Chondrorrhina mediana (Westwood, 1842) 
 Chondrorrhina picina (Schauer, 1938) 
 Chondrorrhina picturata (Harold, 1878) 
 Chondrorrhina specularis Gerstaecker, 1867 - Kenya and Tanzania
 Chondrorrhina tricolor (Bates, 1881) 
 Chondrorrhina trivittata (Schaum, 1841)

Bibliography
 Ruter, G., 1975 Contribution to the biological study of northern senegal part 28 coleoptera cetoniidae. Bulletin de l'Institut Fondamental d'Afrique Noire Serie A Sciences Naturelles 37(3): 661-668
 Massouroudin Akoudjin,  Jean César, Appolinaire Kombassere. Jérémy Bouyer  Spatio-temporal variability of fruit feeding insects used as ecological indicators in West Africa
 Kraatz G. (1880) Genera nova Cetonidarum, Entomologische Monatsblätter 2:17-30
 Fabricius J.C. (1792) Entomologia systematica emendata et aucta. Secundum Classes, Ordines, Genera, Species adjectis Synonimis, Locis, Observationibus, Descriptionibus, Hafniae. C. G. Proft & fils 1:1-538
 Scarabs: World Scarabaeidae Database. Schoolmeesters P., 2011-05-30

References

Scarabaeidae genera
Cetoniinae